The 2009 Cleveland Browns season was the team's 61st season as a professional sports franchise and its 57th season as a member of the National Football League (NFL). The team placed fourth in the AFC North with a record of 5–11, improving upon its 2008 record of 4–12, after winning their last four games of the season after a 1–11 start. This season marked George Kokinis and Eric Mangini's first seasons as the team's general manager and head coach, respectively; however, Kokinis was fired on November 2 during the team's Week 9 bye week. The Browns played all of their home games at Cleveland Browns Stadium in Cleveland, Ohio.

The Browns missed the playoffs for the seventh straight season, tying a record set between 1973–79.

Offseason

Personnel changes
On December 29, 2008, the Cleveland Browns announced that the team had fired general manager Phil Savage and head coach Romeo Crennel after spending four seasons together in Cleveland. Crennel, who joined the Browns with Savage in 2005, left Cleveland with a record of 24–40 (.375) and an 0–8 record against the division rival Pittsburgh Steelers. The team's best record under Crennel was 10–6 during the 2007 season.

On January 7, 2009, the Browns announced that the team had found its replacement for Crennel and that it had reached a contractual agreement with former New York Jets head coach Eric Mangini, who was fired after three seasons in New York. Mangini, who joined the Jets in 2006, left New York with a record of 23–25 (.479), including a 10–6 record and a playoff appearance in his first season.

On January 14, the Browns announced that Mangini had named his coordinators: Brian Daboll was hired as the offensive coordinator; Rob Ryan as the defensive coordinator; and Brad Seely as the special teams coordinator and assistant head coach. Daboll was most recently the quarterbacks coach for the Jets from 2007–2008; Ryan was the defensive coordinator for the Oakland Raiders from 2004–2008; and Seely was the special teams coach for the New England Patriots from 1999–2008. All three worked with Mangini from 2000–2003 as members of New England. Daboll, Ryan and Seely replace Rob Chudzinski, Mel Tucker and Ted Daisher, respectively.

On January 22, the Browns hired five assistant coaches: Bryan Cox was hired as the defensive line coach; Andy Dickerson as the defensive quality control coach; Jerome Henderson as the defensive backs coach; Rick Lyle as an assistant strength-and-conditioning coach; and Carl Smith as the quarterbacks coach. Cox, Dickerson, Henderson and Lyle spent the past three seasons with Mangini in New York. Smith was the Browns' quarterbacks coach from 2001–2003 and was most recently the offensive coordinator for the Jacksonville Jaguars from 2005–2006.

On January 25, the Browns hired former Baltimore Ravens director of pro personnel George Kokinis as general manager. Kokinis spent five seasons in the Browns' scouting department from 1991 to 1995, and after the team moved to Baltimore, he was a member of the Ravens' scouting department from 1996–1999. He was the Ravens' assistant director of pro personnel from 2000–2002 and was the director of pro personnel from 2003–2008.

On February 4, the Browns hired three more assistant coaches: Alan DeGennaro was hired as an assistant strength-and-conditioning coach; Tom Myslinski as the strength-and-conditioning coach; and George Warhop as the offensive line coach. On February 11, the Browns hired George McDonald as the offensive quality control coach. On February 17, the Browns hired Gary Brown as the running backs coach and Steve Hagen as the tight ends coach. On February 22, the Browns hired Matt Eberflus as the linebackers coach.

On May 6, the Browns promoted McDonald to wide receivers coach.

Roster changes

Free agents

Releases

Signings

Trades
On February 27, the Browns traded tight end Kellen Winslow to the Tampa Bay Buccaneers for its second-round selection in the 2009 NFL Draft (50th overall, used to select Mohamed Massaquoi) and its fifth-round selection in the 2010 NFL Draft. Winslow was selected sixth overall by the Browns in the first round of the 2004 NFL Draft and played five seasons with the team. During his career with the Browns, he accumulated 219 receptions for 2,459 yards (11.2 YPC) and had eleven touchdown receptions.

On April 25, during the first round of the 2009 NFL Draft, the team traded its first-round selection (5th overall) to the Jets for its first- and second-round selections (17th and 52nd overall), defensive end Kenyon Coleman, safety Abram Elam and quarterback Brett Ratliff.

2009 draft class

The Browns did not have third-, fifth-, or seventh-round selections in the draft.

Draft notes

Undrafted free agents

Legal troubles for WR Stallworth 
On March 14, Browns wide receiver Donté Stallworth was involved in a fatal accident in which he struck and killed pedestrian Mario Reyes with his car in the early morning in Miami, Florida. Stallworth then stopped his vehicle and called 9–1–1. Reports showed that Stallworth was driving under the influence; his blood-alcohol level was 0.12%, above Florida's legal limit of 0.08%. He was charged with DUI manslaughter and a warrant was issued for his arrest on April 1 and he surrendered to police on April 2. On June 16, Stallworth pleaded guilty. He was sentenced to 30 days in prison, two years' house arrest and eight years' probation. Many believed that the sentence Stallworth received was too lenient as he could have served up to 15 years in jail. Stallworth also reached an undisclosed financial settlement with the victim's family. On June 18, the NFL suspended Stallworth indefinitely On August 13, the NFL officially suspended Stallworth for the entire 2009 season and made plans to reinstate him after the Super Bowl.

Uniform changes
In 2009, the Cleveland Browns wore brown pants for games in which they wear white jerseys. These were worn in the 2008 pre-season. New additions to this uniform combination are striped socks.

Staff

Roster

Opening training camp roster

Week 1 roster

Final roster

Preseason

Schedule

Releases
On September 4 and 5, the Browns released the following players to get down to the 53-player limit: S Hamza Abdullah, FB Charles Ali, CB Brandon Anderson, QB Richard Bartel, CB Tra Battle, LB Beau Bell, T Branndon Braxton, LB Titus Brown, C Dustin Fry, RB Noah Herron, DT Adam Hoppel, WR Paul Hubbard, CB Corey Ivy, RB Chris Jennings, WR Lance Leggett, G Pat Murray, WR Jordan Norwood, WR David Patten, G Kurt Quarterman, DE Brian Schaefering, G Isaac Sowells, DE Santonio Thomas and TE Aaron Walker.

Captains selected
On September 9, the team elected six players to be captains. RB Jamal Lewis and T Joe Thomas were chosen as offensive captains, LB D'Qwell Jackson and LB Eric Barton as defensive captains, and KR Josh Cribbs and K Phil Dawson as special teams captains.

Regular season

Schedule

Note: Intra-divisional opponents are in bold text.

Standings

Game summaries

Week 1: vs. Minnesota Vikings

The Browns opened their season at home against the Minnesota Vikings trying to improve on their 4–12 record from last season. After trading field goals in the first quarter, RB Adrian Peterson scored the first touchdown of the game, giving Minnesota a 10–3 lead. But K Phil Dawson kicked his second field goal and WR Josh Cribbs returned a punt for a touchdown and the Browns took a 13–10 lead into halftime. However, the second half was controlled completely by the Vikings, with QB Brett Favre connecting with WR Percy Harvin for Favre's first touchdown pass as a Viking. In the 4th quarter, QB Brady Quinn completed a touchdown pass to TE Robert Royal, the first touchdown by Cleveland's offense since the 4th quarter of Week 11 in 2008, ending a span of 416 offensive plays without a touchdown.

With the loss, Cleveland fell to 0–1.

Week 2: at Denver Broncos

Hoping to rebound from their home loss to the Vikings, the Browns flew to Invesco Field at Mile High for a Week 2 duel with the Denver Broncos. After recovering a fumble on the opening kickoff, the Browns started with a short field but couldn't capitalize, settling for a 22-yard field goal by kicker Phil Dawson. Broncos quarterback Kyle Orton completed a 2-yard touchdown pass to tight end Tony Scheffler for the game's first touchdown, and after a 47-yard field goal by Cleveland, the game was 7–6 after the first quarter. However, Cleveland's offensive struggles continued. Meanwhile, in the second and third quarter, kicker Matt Prater gave Denver a 23-yard and a 38-yard field goal. Afterwards, in the fourth quarter, the Broncos took control with touchdown runs by Peyton Hillis and Correll Buckhalter.

With the loss, the Browns fell to 0–2.

Week 3: at Baltimore Ravens

Hoping to rebound from their road loss to the Broncos, the Browns flew to M&T Bank Stadium for a Week 3 AFC North duel with the Baltimore Ravens. Cleveland trailed early in the first quarter as Ravens running back Willis McGahee got a 7-yard touchdown run, followed by kicker Steven Hauschka getting a 36-yard field goal. The Browns' deficit increased in the second quarter as Hauschka nailed a 33-yard field goal, while McGahee got a 15-yard touchdown run.

In the third quarter, things continued to get worse for the Browns as running back Ray Rice got a 9-yard touchdown run. In the fourth quarter, Cleveland managed to get on the board as kicker Billy Cundiff made a 29-yard field goal. Afterwards, Baltimore closed out the game as quarterback Joe Flacco completed a 72-yard touchdown pass to wide receiver Derrick Mason.

With the loss, the Browns fell to 0–3.

Starting quarterback Brady Quinn (6 of 8, 34 yards, 1 INT) was benched after a dismal first half performance, while Derek Anderson (11 of 19, 92 yards, 3 INTs) did not perform much better.

Week 4: vs. Cincinnati Bengals

Still looking for their first win of the season, the Browns went home for a Week 4 AFC North duel with the Cincinnati Bengals in Round 1 of 2009's Battle of Ohio. Due to quarterback Brady Quinn's poor performance in the season thus far, head coach Eric Mangini named quarterback Derek Anderson the starter.

Cleveland trailed early in the first quarter as Bengals quarterback Carson Palmer completed a 5-yard touchdown pass to wide receiver Chad Ochocinco. The Browns continued to struggle in the second quarter as defensive end Robert Geathers returned a fumble 75 yards for a touchdown. Cleveland responded with Anderson completing a 1-yard touchdown pass to tight end Steve Heiden.

The Browns tied the game in the third quarter with Anderson's 1-yard touchdown run. Afterwards, Cleveland took the lead in the fourth quarter with a 26-yard and a 31-yard field goal from kicker Billy Cundiff. However, Cincinnati answered with Palmer hooking up with Ochocinco again on a 2-yard touchdown run (with a blocked PAT). In overtime, both teams went back and forth with their possessions. In the end, the Bengals emerged victorious with kicker Shayne Graham kicking the game-winning 31-yard field goal.

With the loss, the Browns fell to 0–4.

WR Edwards traded

On October 7, the Browns traded WR Braylon Edwards to the New York Jets for WR Chansi Stuckey, LB Jason Trusnik, and third- and fifth-round selections in the 2010 NFL Draft. The third-round selection would have become a second-round selection if Edwards met certain performance criteria with the Jets, but he did not.

Week 5: at Buffalo Bills

After a heartbreaking loss to the Bengals, the Browns headed to Buffalo, the site of their last win in Week 11 of the 2008 season, trying to avoid tying a franchise record 11 straight losses. In very windy conditions, the Browns' hero was punter Dave Zastudil who pinned the Bills within their 5-yard line three times. After trading field goals in the 2nd and 3rd quarters, the Browns recovered a fumble on a punt return by WR Roscoe Parrish, and kicker Billy Cundiff secured the victory with a short field goal. The Browns won despite QB Derek Anderson completing only 2 of 17 passes (11.8%) for 23 yards, setting a record for lowest completion percentage in a win since the AFL-NFL merger. This also marked Eric Mangini's first win as head coach of the Browns.

With the win, the Browns improved to 1–4. Zastudil was named the AFC special teams player of the week.

Week 6: at Pittsburgh Steelers

After securing their first win of the season, the Browns went on the road to take on their archrival Pittsburgh Steelers. The Browns came into the game having lost their last 11 games against the Steelers. The Steelers struck first with two touchdown passes from Ben Roethlisberger in the 2nd quarter. Josh Cribbs ran a kickoff back 98 yards for a touchdown to get the Browns within 7. However, the Browns could never close the gap and fell to the Steelers, 27–14.

With the loss, the Browns fell to 1–5.

Week 7: vs. Green Bay Packers

Hoping to rebound from their road loss to the Steelers, the Browns went home for a Week 7 interconference duel with the Green Bay Packers. After a scoreless first quarter, Cleveland began the second quarter with kicker Billy Cundiff's 22-yard field goal. However, the Packers took charge with quarterback Aaron Rodgers completing a 45-yard touchdown pass to tight end Spencer Havner and a 71-yard touchdown pass to wide receiver Donald Driver, followed by a 1-yard touchdown run by running back Ryan Grant.

Afterwards, Green Bay pulled away in the second half with kicker Mason Crosby booting an 18-yard field goal in the third quarter and Rodgers finding wide receiver James Jones on a 5-yard touchdown pass.

With the loss, the Browns stumbled to 1–6.

Week 8: at Chicago Bears

Trying to snap a two-game losing streak, the Browns flew to Soldier Field for a Week 8 interconference duel with the Chicago Bears. The Browns' defense held up well early, limiting the Bears to three field goals by kicker Robbie Gould (a 37-yard and a 29-yard in the first quarter and a 32-yard in the second). However, the Browns could not manage to get on the board and Chicago RB Matt Forte scored on a 1-yard run, putting the Browns down 16 at the half. The Browns struck first in the third quarter on a one-yard run by QB Derek Anderson, but the PAT was blocked. Forte scored again in the third with a 10-yard touchdown run and the Bears put the Browns away with a 21-yard interception return for a touchdown by CB Charles Tillman in the fourth quarter. Late in the fourth, Derek Anderson was benched for Brady Quinn after going 6 of 17 (35.2%) for 76 yards and 2 interceptions.

With the loss, the Browns went into their bye week at 1–7.

GM Kokinis fired
On November 2, the Browns fired general manager George Kokinis after getting off to a disappointing 1–7 start. The Browns' statement said that Kokinis "is no longer actively involved with the organization." Owner Randy Lerner reportedly asked for his resignation, and when Kokinis refused, sought a dismissal "for cause." Head coach Eric Mangini was told by Lerner that his job was safe for the moment.

Week 10: vs. Baltimore Ravens

The Browns came out of their bye week with Brady Quinn as the starting quarterback again and looking to turn around their disappointing season. They hosted the Baltimore Ravens on Monday Night Football. Both teams played a scoreless first half, the first scoreless half in the NFL this season and only the ninth ever in 620 Monday Night Football games. The Ravens took over in the third with two touchdowns in 15 seconds (a 13-yard touchdown run from running back Ray Rice and safety Dawan Landry's 48-yard interception return for a touchdown). Kicker Steven Hauschka added a 44-yard field goal and the Browns could not score. This was the Browns' first shutout of the year.

With the loss, the Browns fell to 1–8.

Week 11: at Detroit Lions

Looking to snap a four-game losing streak, the 1–8 Browns flew to Ford Field for a Week 11 interconference duel with the 1–8 Detroit Lions. Both teams began the game with field goals, as Cleveland kicker Phil Dawson made a 44-yard field goal while Lions kicker Jason Hanson got a 31-yard field goal. Afterwards, the Browns' offense exploded as quarterback Brady Quinn completed a 59-yard touchdown pass to rookie wide receiver Mohamed Massaquoi, a 40-yard touchdown pass to wide receiver Chansi Stuckey and a 4-yard touchdown pass to wide receiver Josh Cribbs. Detroit answered with quarterback Matthew Stafford completing a 26-yard touchdown pass to running back Aaron Brown. The Lions tied the game in the second quarter as Stafford hooked up with running back Kevin Smith on a 25-yard touchdown pass, followed by a 75-yard touchdown pass to wide receiver Calvin Johnson. Afterwards, Cleveland ended the half with Dawson nailing a 29-yard field goal.

After Detroit took the lead in the third quarter with Stafford's 1-yard touchdown pass to tight end Will Heller, the Browns picked up a safety after Stafford was called for intentional grounding from his own end zone. In the fourth quarter, Cleveland regained the lead with Quinn's 2-yard touchdown pass to tight end Michael Gaines (followed by running back Jamal Lewis getting a 2-point conversion run). The Lions took over, and with no time left, Browns safety Brodney Pool intercepted the ball. However, cornerback Hank Poteat was flagged for pass interference in the end zone. Since the game cannot end on a defensive penalty, Detroit was given one untimed down from the Browns' 1-yard line and Stafford completed the game-winning touchdown pass to tight end Brandon Pettigrew.

With the loss in the 1–8 battle, Cleveland fell to 1–9, assuring a last-place finish in their division.

Week 12: at Cincinnati Bengals

The Browns headed to Cincinnati to face their in-state rivals in Week 12. The Bengals struck first with 2 field goals by Shayne Graham and a touchdown reception by J. P. Foschi in the first half. Brady Quinn had a touchdown run in the third, but another Bengals field goal and defense put the Browns away.

With the loss, the Browns fell to 1–10 and were officially eliminated from postseason contention.

Week 13: vs. San Diego Chargers

The Browns stayed home in Week 13 to take on the San Diego Chargers. The Browns struck first with an 11-yard touchdown reception by Mohamed Massaquoi. The Chargers took the lead back in the first on a field goal by Nate Kaeding and a long touchdown reception by Mike Tolbert. San Diego scored 17 more in the second and third, seemingly putting the game out of reach. The Browns managed to get within a touchdown but their comeback ran out of time.

With the loss, the Browns fell to 1–11.

Week 14: vs. Pittsburgh Steelers

The Browns hosted the rival Pittsburgh Steelers on a night with subzero wind chills for a Week 14 duel. In windy conditions, Phil Dawson hit a pair of 29-yard field goals and Chris Jennings had a 10-yard touchdown run to put the Browns up 13. Jeff Reed nailed a field goal before the half to draw the Steelers within 10 and hit another in the third to bring them within a touchdown. However, a scoreless fourth by both teams led the Browns to their first win against the Steelers since 2003, and the Browns became only the fourth team in NFL history to be at least 10 games under .500 and defeat the defending Super Bowl champions.

With the win, the Browns improved to 2–11, snapped a twelve-game losing streak against the Steelers and won against them for the first time since 2003 when they defeated the team 33–13 in Pittsburgh. The team also won their first home game since an October 2008 victory, against the Super Bowl champion New York Giants. KR Josh Cribbs was named AFC Special Teams Player of the Week.

Week 15: at Kansas City Chiefs

The Browns headed into Kansas City for their last road game of the year to take on the Chiefs in Week 15. The Browns and Chiefs traded field goals in the first quarter and then Josh Cribbs returned the ensuing kickoff 100 yards for a touchdown, setting an NFL record with his 7th kickoff return for a touchdown. After another Phil Dawson field goal in the second, the Chiefs scored three straight touchdowns to take a 24–13 lead. However, Cribbs again ran a kickoff back for a touchdown, this time for 103 yards and extending his NFL record to eight kickoff return touchdowns. In the second half, Jerome Harrison rushed for three touchdowns and amassed a majority of his 286 rushing yards. This set a Browns' rushing record for a single game, was the record for most rushing yards in the NFL this season, and was the third most rushing yards in a game in NFL history. Matt Cassel's final desperation pass ricocheted off the cross bar, and the Browns defeated the Chiefs 41–34, with their highest point total of the season.

With the win, the Browns improved to 3–11 and finished the season 2–6 on the road. Cribbs was named the AFC special teams player of the week for the second straight week.

Holmgren hired as president
On December 21, Mike Holmgren was hired by the Browns to take over as their president. His duties included personnel management, and he also had the power to replace Eric Mangini as head coach.

Week 16: vs. Oakland Raiders

The Browns stayed home in Week 16 for a match with the Oakland Raiders, trying to extend their two-game winning streak. The Browns struck first with a 17-yard run by Jerome Harrison and a 42-yard field goal from Phil Dawson. Oakland kicker Sebastian Janikowski hit three field goals in the first half, including a 61 yarder to close out the half. However, the Browns led at halftime, 17–9. The Browns held the Raiders scoreless in the second half and Dawson hit two more field goals to lead the Browns to a 23–9 victory, their third in a row.

With the win, the Browns improved to 4–11.

Week 17: vs. Jacksonville Jaguars

The Browns closed out their season at home with a contest against the Jacksonville Jaguars, who came into the game with an outside chance of making the playoffs. Cleveland and Jacksonville traded field goals in the first quarter, but Josh Cribbs broke the tie in the second with a 14-yard touchdown run and Phil Dawson added another field goal to give the Browns a 10-point lead at the half. In the third, Jerome Harrison added a 6-yard touchdown run to push the lead to 17. In the fourth, Zach Miller caught a 6-yard pass from David Garrard to close within 10, but Dawson added another field goal. On the final play of the game (and the season), Miller caught another touchdown pass from Garrard but it was not enough and the Browns won 23–17. The Browns' 4-game winning streak was the longest since 1994.

With the win, the Browns improved to finish the season at 5–11, a one-win improvement over the 2008 campaign. They finished 3–5 at home.

KR Cribbs honored
On January 6, WR/KR Josh Cribbs was named AFC special teams player of the month for December. During the month, Cribbs earned AFC special teams player of the week honors twice and set an NFL record with eight career kickoff returns for touchdowns.

2010 Pro Bowl
KR Josh Cribbs and T Joe Thomas were recognized for individual accomplishments as they were named to the AFC roster for the 2010 Pro Bowl. Cribbs, who made his second appearance, was the starting kick and punt returner. Thomas, who made his third consecutive appearance in the game, was selected as the reserve offensive tackle, but started in the game because of an injury to Jake Long of the Miami Dolphins.

References

External links
 2009 Cleveland Browns season at Pro Football Reference (Profootballreference.com)
 2009 Cleveland Browns season at ESPN 
 2009 Cleveland Browns Statistics at jt-sw.com
 2009 Cleveland Browns Schedule at jt-sw.com
 2009 Cleveland Browns at DatabaseFootball.com  

Cleveland
Cleveland Browns seasons
Cleveland